This list contains the names and schools of all Kappa Sigma chapters and colonies. The fraternity was established at the University of Virginia in 1869.

Undergraduate chapters 
Active chapters are indicated in bold. Inactive chapters and closed schools are indicated in italic.

Notes

Alumni chapters 
 
Active chapters are indicated in bold. Inactive chapters are indicated in italic.

References 

Chapters
Lists of chapters of United States student societies by society